VIA Metropolitan Transit (abbreviated as VIA, or VIA Metro) is the mass transit agency serving San Antonio, Texas, United States, and its surrounding municipalities. It began operation in 1978 as a successor to the San Antonio Transit System.

In addition to the city of San Antonio, VIA serves many other Bexar County municipalities, including Alamo Heights, Balcones Heights, Castle Hills, Converse, Kirby, Leon Valley, Olmos Park, Shavano Park, and Terrell Hills. While VIA does not directly serve some Bexar County municipalities such as Hill Country Village, Hollywood Park, Live Oak, Selma, Schertz, Universal City and Windcrest, many of them are within driving proximity of outlying park and ride facilities.

History 

VIA was created in 1977 when the citizens of Bexar County voted in favor of a one-half cent sales tax to fund the service. Subsequently, VIA purchased transit assets from the City of San Antonio and began operations in March 1978, taking its name from the Latin word for "road". In 2004, city voters in San Antonio approved the formation of the Advanced Transportation District. This quarter-cent sales tax expanded and improved VIA operations.

VIA has received several accolades from the American Public Transportation Association, most notably the award for Best Transit System in North America in 1990, as well as several of APTA's safety awards in multiple years.

In March 2020, fares on all VIA services were temporarily suspended due to the COVID-19 pandemic. The fare suspension was set to last until April 1, 2020, but was later extended until the end of May 2020. On April 6, 2020, VIA implemented temporary service changes, including temporarily suspending some routes, implementing capacity limits on buses, and changing their fleet to Saturday service hours. On April 27, 2020, VIA implemented further temporary service changes, including suspending additional routes and further decreasing frequency. Fare collection continued on June 1st, 2020, and capacity limits were later removed on June 1st, 2021.

Services 

VIA operates more than 500 buses (all are wheelchair accessible) on 116 bus routes ranging from routes 2 to 651, serving the entire city of San Antonio and the majority of Bexar County. About 36 million trips are made on VIA every year. The bus routes are separated into Express, Frequent, Metro, Primo, and Skip (limited stop routes). VIA provides special event service from its Park & Ride locations to events such as San Antonio Spurs basketball games at the AT&T Center, selected annual Fiesta San Antonio activities, and the San Antonio Stock Show & Rodeo. VIA also offers "VIATrans" paratransit services for disabled travelers.

Fares for VIA have remained relatively modest during its existence. At its inception in 1978, fares were 25¢ for most routes. Fares for most fixed routes during 2006 were 80¢, and a monthly bus pass was $20, much lower than most other transit systems in the country. On January 1, 2007, basic fares were raised to $1, and monthly pass prices were raised to $25. Basic fares increased to $1.10 and monthly pass prices were raised to $30 on January 1, 2009. On March 1, 2014, the basic bus fare was $1.20; day passes were $4 and a 31-day pass was $35.  the base fare is $1.30; day passes are $2.75; 7-day passes are $12 and 31-day passes are $38. No fare to children below 5 who ride with fare-paying rider (limit 3). On November 9, 2019 transfers became free and are included when paying to board the bus. To transfer from local to express, the difference of the service must be paid. 1 Day, 7 Day and 31 Day Passes are accepted on all routes except for VIATrans and Special Event Service.

High school, college, and trade students are able to purchase a semester pass for $38 with proof of enrollment. Upon boarding, students must display valid VIA issued IDs, or school IDs with stickers for the semester. Students, faculty, and staff attending or working for the Alamo Colleges District, Our Lady of the Lake University, Texas A&M San Antonio, The University of Texas at San Antonio, and The University of the Incarnate Word can ride the bus for free by showing their school-issued goMobile pass as part of VIA's U-Pass program.

Prímo Service 
VIA added a limited-stop bus service known as Prímo to the Fredericksburg Road corridor on December 17, 2012. Designated as Route 100, it connects the South Texas Medical Center to Downtown San Antonio. The route used to connect the main campus of the University of Texas at San Antonio to its downtown campus using an extension from the Medical Center to the UTSA Main Campus, as well as a second extension that ran from the Medical Center to the nearby independent city of Leon Valley until January 2017 (when the extensions were split into Route 101 which later became Route 501 in January 2019). An expansion of Prímo to Zarzamora Street opened in January 2019 and an expansion to Military Drive opened in late August 2019, additionally VIA is looking into other corridors to which to add improved bus transit in the coming decades.

While the new 100 route replaced two busy routes on the heavily used Fredericksburg corridor, the 91 Skip Service and the 92 Frequent, it did not affect multiple-stop service from other routes that also run along their portions of Fredericksburg (Routes 96, and 97). Unlike the 91 or the 92, which continued down lower Fredericksburg (still served by the 95, 96 and 97) to downtown along the Navarro/St. Mary's one-way couplet, the 100 opts for nonstop service on I-10 between Fredericksburg and Downtown and then uses Frio to connect to the Centro Plaza between W Houston and Frio Streets then travels the Market/Commerce couplet.

Special Event Service 
VIA runs special service for major events in San Antonio, ranging from sporting events such as UTSA home football games, San Antonio Spurs home games, the annual Valero Alamo Bowl, and events such as the Monster Jam, Fiesta San Antonio, and The Texas Folklife Festival. Park & Ride Service is usually offered from the Randolph, and Crossroads Park/Rides as well as the Frank Madla Transit Center. The cost for the service is $2.50 one way, $5 round trip with discounts for students, children 5-11, seniors 62+, and persons with disabilities.

VIA Link Service 
On August 18, 2019 VIA launched a new ride share service in the Northeast Zone to replace three Metro Service routes which ran once every sixty minutes. Routes 640, 641, and 642 were retired in favor of this new service which promised more frequent service reliability as well as more flexible drop off points compared to traditional fixed route service. This service was later expanded to replace Routes 605 & 660 in the Northwest Zone, and Routes 524 McMullen extension to Palo Alto College & 672 in the South Zone.

Governance 
VIA is governed by an eleven-member Board of Trustees, all of whom have two-year terms.

Ten of the trustees are appointed by the various governmental entities in Bexar County—the City of San Antonio appoints five members, the Bexar County Commissioners Court appoints three, and the mayors of the suburban cities acting in concert appoint two. The appointed trustees then elect a chairperson as the Board's eleventh member. The current President and CEO is Jeffrey C. "Jeff" Arndt.

Routes

Types of Routes

List of Routes 
The following is a list of VIA's routes as of the service changes on January 9, 2023. Many routes that travel through Downtown San Antonio or change directions at a major transfer point continue with a different number; this route pair is also indicated.

Current Fleet 

VIA's fleet consists of compressed natural gas, and diesel-electric hybrid vehicles.

References

External links 

VIA System Map

Transportation in San Antonio
Bus transportation in Texas
Bus rapid transit in Texas